Carrizo is a census-designated place in Gila County, Arizona, United States, located on the Fort Apache Indian Reservation. 

The community's name is Spanish for "reeds" and is likely derived from the Carrizo band of Apache.

History
It was the location of, or the nearest community to, the Black River Bridge (Carrizo, Arizona), which is listed on the National Register of Historic Places.

Carrizo's population was 25 in the 1960 census.

Demographics

As of the 2010 Census, its population was 127, of which 125 were Native American.

Transportation
The White Mountain Apache Tribe operates the Fort Apache Connection Transit, which provides local bus service.

References

Census-designated places in Gila County, Arizona
White Mountain Apache Tribe